Elbow Falls is a small set of waterfalls along the Elbow River, west of the hamlet of Bragg Creek within Kananaskis Improvement District, Alberta.

Overnight camping is available at several nearby campgrounds.

After the 2013 Alberta floods, the day use area was destroyed. The Elbow River overflowed its banks and destroyed all of the picnicking area and most of the paved trails. The riverbed itself also suffered major destruction, now being replaced by mounds of rock, rather than soil and trees.

References

External links
 Elbow River Valley Map (PDF)
 Alberta Parks Elbow Falls Provincial Recreation Area
 Elbow Falls High Spring Flow Hd Video

Kananaskis Improvement District
Waterfalls of Alberta
Cascade waterfalls